Juho Rantala (born 13 December 1974 in Helsinki) is a football manager and former defender/midfielder. He is an assistant manager with the Finland national under-19 football team.

References

Living people
1974 births
Finnish footballers
Finnish football managers
FC Honka managers
Association football defenders
Association football midfielders